Jackson Tetreault (born June 3, 1996) is an American professional baseball pitcher in the Washington Nationals organization. He made his MLB debut in 2022.

Career
A native of Ruskin, Florida, Tetreault attended Earl J. Lennard High School. His father, Curt Tetreault, was one of his baseball coaches, as well as a local tennis pro; he taught his son how to incorporate some of the mechanics of a tennis serve into his pitching windup, delivery, and followthrough. After high school, Tetreault pitched one season for Cameron University in Oklahoma before transferring back to the Tampa Bay Area to attend and play baseball at State College of Florida, Manatee–Sarasota. The Nationals drafted him in the seventh round of the 2017 Major League Baseball draft and signed him for a reported $300,000 bonus.

After pitching for the Gulf Coast League Nationals and Auburn Doubledays, short-season teams, during his first taste of professional baseball in 2017, Tetreault advanced to full-season ball by the 2018 season, which he split between the Class-A Hagerstown Suns and Class A-Advanced Potomac Nationals. During the offseason, he lived in West Palm Beach, across the Florida peninsula from his hometown, to work out at the Nationals' spring training complex and prepare for the next season. Before the 2019 season, MLB Pipeline ranked him as the Nationals' 27th-best prospect. In late April 2019, the 22-year-old Tetreault was promoted to the Class-AA Harrisburg Senators for the first time. In 2021, he made his Class-AAA debut for the Rochester Red Wings. He was promoted to the major leagues to make his debut against the Atlanta Braves on June 14, 2022. Tetreault pitched four innings, and took the loss, yielding seven runs on nine hits. He was sent outright off the 40-man roster on November 15, 2022.

Pitching style
Tetreault stands  and has a lanky build. He throws a fastball in the low to mid-90s, a cutter, a curveball, and a changeup.

References

External links

1996 births
Living people
Baseball players from Florida
People from Ruskin, Florida
Major League Baseball pitchers
Washington Nationals players
Cameron Aggies baseball players
SCF Manatees baseball players
Gulf Coast Nationals players
Auburn Doubledays players
Hagerstown Suns players
Potomac Nationals players
Harrisburg Senators players
Rochester Red Wings players
Wilmington Blue Rocks players
Florida Complex League Nationals players